Lawyer Lawyer (Cantonese , Jyutping syun3 sei2 cou2, literally "compute death weed") is a 1997 Hong Kong comedy film produced, directed and co-written by Joe Ma.

Plot
Stephen Chow is Chan Mong-Gut, a famous Chinese lawyer, who must defend his apprentice Foon, who got framed for murder, in court.

Stephen Chow stars as Chan Mong-Gut, a famous Chinese lawyer who was killed in the Qing dynasty. He must defend his apprentice, Foon, who has been framed for murder in Hong Kong. Being the third worst lawyer in China, he challenges the British legal system with no evidence on hand and manages to identify the killer in a hilarious way.

1997

The film was released during the same year as the Transfer of sovereignty over Hong Kong. As the film deals specifically with the issue of justice, it can be interpreted as responding to the fears of the PRC takeover and to the general uncertainty of what that meant to the people of Hong Kong, as long as you ignore the content of the movie itself, which implicates the UK as the source of injustice. The film promotes a normative vision of justice that can prevail over any tyranny, suggesting that knowledge of law, and the freedom to express it, is more important than brute strength (as embodied by the trials and tribulations of Chang Mong-Gut over countless foes).

Cast
 Stephen Chow as Chan Mong-Gut     (credited Steven Chow)
 Eric Kot as Foon
 Karen Mok
 Chingmy Yau
 Kar-ying Law     (credited as Law Ka Ying)
 Tat-ming Cheung     (credited as Cheung Tat Ming)
 Vincent Kok
 Tats Lau     (credited as Lau Yee Tat)
 Paul Fonoroff
 Bowie Lam
 Spencer Lam     (credited as Lam Sheung Yee)'
 Siu-kei Lee    (credited as Lee Siu Kee)
 Simon Lui
 Wyman Wong
 Moses Chan
 King-fai Chung     (credited as Chung King Fai)
 Bobby Yip     (credited as Bat Leung Gam)
 Kin-yan Lee     (credited as Lee Kin Yan)
 Quinton Wong     (credited as Quin Tin Wong)
 Madam Nancy
 Kai-man Tin     (credited as Tin Kai Man)

External links
 
 Lawyer, Lawyer at Hong Kong Cinemagic
 

1997 films
1990s Cantonese-language films
1997 comedy-drama films
Films directed by Joe Ma
Hong Kong comedy-drama films
1990s Hong Kong films